Hormozgan Province is one of the 31 provinces of Iran. It is in the south of the country, in Iran's Region 2, facing Oman, UAE and the Hormuz Straits.

At the time of the National Census of 2006, Hormuzgan province showed a population of 1,365,377 people in 303,323 households. At the following census in 2011, the population had increased to 1,578,183 in 396,927 households. By the time of the last census conducted in 2016, the population had risen to 1,776,415 in 493,660 households.

History 

Although Hormozgan is known to have been settled during the Achaemenid era when Nearchus passed through the region, recorded history of the main port of Hormozgan (Bandar‑e Hormoz) begins with Ardashir I of Persia of the Sassanid empire.

The province is said to have been particularly prosperous between 241 BC and 211 BC, but grew even further in trade and commercial significance after the arrival of the Islamic era.

Marco Polo visited the port of Bandar Abbas in 1272 and 1293. He reported widespread trading in Persian jewelry, ivory and silk of Indochina, and pearls from Bahrain in the bazaars of the port of Hormuz.

In 1497 Europeans landed in the region for the first time, headed by Vasco da Gama. In 1508 the Portuguese, led by Afonso de Albuquerque invaded the area with seven warships, under the pretext of protecting their interests from Egypt and Venice. The port of Hormuz at the time was considered strategically positioned for commercial interests in the Persian Gulf.

Ismail I who was trying to counter the Ottoman Empire to the west, was unable to save the port from the Portuguese, until Shah Abbas I was finally able to drive them out of the Persian Gulf with the aid of the British. The name of Bandar Abbas comes directly from the name of Shah Abbas I.

The British, meanwhile, were competing for influence in the region with Dutch colonialists, who invaded Qeshm Island and dispatched warships to Bandar Abbas during the final years of Shah Abbas' reign. The Persian government was unable to defend itself against this attack. However, with the souring of British and Dutch relations, military tensions grew in the region. The Dutch finally resorted to moving their base up to Kharg Island.

The Amir of Kharg, Mir Mahna Baloch and Mir Hamal Kalmati with Baloch army defeated the Europeans from Bander Abbas till Karachi, so the Dutch and other forces at Kharg, leaving the British firmly in charge of the entire region. Soon Britain took control over the entire Persian Gulf via the British East India Company. The British adopted policy encouraging local autonomy throughout the Persian Gulf to in order to prevent a formidable unified force from threatening their establishments in the gulf.

The strategic importance of the Persian Gulf further increased after World War I with the discovery of oil in the region.

Geography and climate 
The province is primarily mountainous, consisting of the southern tip of the Zagros Range. The province experiences a very hot and humid climate, with temperatures sometimes exceeding 120 °F (49 °C) in summers. There is very little precipitation year-round.

Administrative divisions

Cities 
According to the 2016 census, 976,652 people (nearly 55% of the population of Hormozgan province) live in the following cities: Abu Musa 4,213, Bandar Abbas 526,648, Bandar Charak 4,066, Bandar Khamir 20,150, Bandar Lengeh 30,435, Bastak 9,959, Bika 7,190, Dargahan 14,525, Dashti 4,695, Fareghan 1,773, Fin 3,939, Garuk 4,008, Gowharan 1,170, Hajjiabad 28,977, Hasht Bandi 6,718, Hormuz 5,891, Jask 16,860, Jenah 6,910, Kish 39,853, Kong 19,213, Kuhestak 3,060, Kushk-e Nar 3,260, Lamazan 2,745, Minab 73,170, Parsian 18,045, Qaleh Qazi 5,286, Qeshm 40,678, Rudan 36,121, Ruydar 6,558, Sardasht 1,725, Sar-e Gaz-e Ahmadi 1,157, Senderk 1,915, Sirik 5,137, Suza 5,707, Takht 3,082, Tazian-e Pain 4,263, Tirur 4,871, and Ziarat-e Ali 2,679.

Most populous cities 
The following table lists the most populous cities in Hormozgan:

Hormozgan today 

Hormozgan today has 11 ports, five national airports, and three international airports. The province has an active agriculture sector, ranking first in Iran in lime production and second in date production. 30% of Iran's fishery produce comes from this province. Three major hydro dams serve the water needs of the province — Esteghlal Dam (i.e., Minab Dam, which supplies major part of consuming water of the Bandar Abbas), Jegin Dam, and Shemil Dam.

Germany has recently offered to build a bridge that would connect Qeshm island to the mainland, a formidable project.

Hormozgan has two free trade zones, one in Kish, the other on Qeshm island. Kish Island, situated in a free-trade zone, is home of the Iranian oil bourse (one of five exchanges of its kind in the world, and the only one explicitly not trading oil and derivatives in U.S. dollars).

Attractions 

Hormozgan has four- and five-star hotels with modern amenities. The Cultural Heritage Organization of Iran lists 212 sites of historical and cultural significance in the province. Some of the more popular attractions are:
 Emarat-e Kolah Farangi (built by and during the Dutch occupation)
 Berkeh haye Baran (six traditional water reservoirs)
 Gele-dari traditional bath
 The Hindu temple
 Latidan Bridge, built during the era of Shah Abbas I
 Fekri House
 Sa'di House
 Fort of Our Lady of the Conception in Hormoz island
 Qeshm Island
 Hara marine forests
 Kish Island, the most popular tourist resort in southern Iran in the Persian Gulf
 Geno UNESCO natural biosphere reserve
 Hara UNESCO natural biosphere reserve
 Various hot water springs

Colleges and Universities 
 Bandar Abbas University of Medical Sciences
 University of Hormozgan
 Qeshm Institute of Higher Education 
 Islamic Azad University of Bandar Abbas
 Payame Noor University of Hormozgan
 Islamic Azad University of Roudan 
 Kish University

See also 
 Bandar Abbas
 Bastak 
 Kookherd
 Maghoh
 Mir-Mahna (video game)
 Morbagh
 Ormus
 The Historic Bath of Siba—An ancient bath house that is believed dated back to the Sassanid dynasty.

References

Further reading
 Afshar Sistani, Iraj, Shenakht-e ostan-e Hormozgan, Tehran 2000
 Barbera, Gerardo, "Hormozgan: Situação linguística e aspectos culturais", Âyiné. International Journal of Islamic Societies and Cultures, 1, 2013, pp. 130–147

External links 

 Official website of Hormozgan Governorship
 Hormozgan Cultural Heritage Organization
 Hara UNESCO Biosphere Reserve
 Geno UNESCO Biosphere Reserve

 
Gulf of Oman
Persian Gulf
Provinces of Iran